The 1938 Washington Huskies football team was an American football team that represented the University of Washington during the 1938 college football season. In its ninth season under head coach Jimmy Phelan, the team compiled a 3–5–1 record, finished in sixth place in the Pacific Coast Conference, and was outscored by its opponents by a combined total of 83 to 68. Frank Peters was the team captain.

Schedule

NFL Draft selections
Seven University of Washington Huskies were selected in the 1939 NFL Draft, which lasted 22 rounds, with 200 selections.

References

Washington
Washington Huskies football seasons
Washington Huskies football